Mark Edward Hudspith (born 19 January 1969) is a male English former long-distance runner.

Athletics career
Hudspith represented England and won the bronze medal in the Marathon at the 1994 Commonwealth Games in Victoria. At the time he was the first Briton to win a major championship medal in the Marathon in 10 years, since Charlie Spedding won bronze at the 1984 Olympics in Los Angeles. Eight years later he represented England again at the 2002 Commonwealth Games.

Personal life
Hudspith studied at Durham University. He achieved a personal best time of 2:11:58 in London on 2 April 1995.

References

Living people
1969 births
English male marathon runners
Commonwealth Games medallists in athletics
Commonwealth Games bronze medallists for England
Alumni of Hatfield College, Durham
Athletes (track and field) at the 1994 Commonwealth Games
Athletes (track and field) at the 2002 Commonwealth Games
Medallists at the 1994 Commonwealth Games